2009–10 Atlantic Hockey Atlantic ice hockey member teams are:

 Air Force Falcons
 American International Yellow Jackets
 Army Black Knights
 Bentley Falcons
 Canisius Golden Griffins
 Connecticut Huskies
 Holy Cross Crusaders
 Mercyhurst Lakers
 Niagara Purple Eagles
 RIT Tigers
 Robert Morris Colonials
 Sacred Heart Pioneers

2009-10 standings

Awards
The awards were presented on March 18, 2010 at the Atlantic Hockey awards banquet at the Radisson Hotel Riverside in Rochester, New York.

Team awards
 RIT Tigers, Regular Season Champions
 Army Black Knights, Team Sportsmanship Award

Individual awards
 Jared DeMichiel, Regular season goaltending, RIT Tigers
 Cory Conacher, Regular season scoring, Canisius Golden Griffins
 Cory Conacher, Player of the Year, Canisius Golden Griffins
 Chris Tanev, Rookie of the Year, RIT Tigers
 C. J. Marottolo, Coach of the Year, Sacred Heart Pioneers
 Dave Jarman, Best Defensive Forward, Sacred Heart Pioneers
 Dan Ringwald, Best Defenseman, RIT Tigers
 Chris Risi, Individual Sportsmanship Award, Mercyhurst Lakers

All-conference teams

First team
 Cory Conacher,   Canisius,  Junior  Forward
 Nick Johnson,   Sacred Heart,   Senior  Forward
 Jacques Lamoureux,   Air Force,   Junior  Forward
 Tim Kirby,   Air Force,   Sophomore  Defense
 Dan Ringwald,   RIT,   Senior  Defense
 Jared DeMichiel,   RIT,   Senior  Goaltender

Second team
 Brandon Coccimigilo,  Mercyhurst,  Junior  Forward
 Andrew Favot,  RIT,  Junior  Forward
 Cody Omilusik, Army,  Junior  Forward
 Marcel Alvarez,  Army,  Sophomore  Defense
 Carl Hudson,  Canisius,  Senior  Defense
 Andrew Volkening,  Air Force,  Senior  Goaltender

Third team
 Cameron Burt,  RIT,  Sophomore  Forward
 Dave Jarman,  Sacred Heart,  Senior  Forward
 Vincent Scarcella,  Canisius,  Junior  Forward
 Paul Ferraro,  Sacred Heart,  Senior  Defense
 Chris Tanev,  RIT  Freshman,  Defense
 Ryan Zapolski,  Mercyhurst,  Junior  Goaltender

Rookie Team
 Joe Campanelli,  Bentley,  Forward
 Eric Delong,  Sacred Heart,  Forward
 Adam Pleskach,  AIC,  Forward
 Alex Greke,  UConn,  Defense
 Chris Tanev,  RIT,  Defense
 Steven Legatto,  Sacred Heart,  Goaltender

References

Atlantic Hockey